Megachile toscata is a species of bee in the family Megachilidae. It was described by Mitchell in 1934.

References

Toscata
Insects described in 1934